Philippe Thibaut is a French designer and producer of several popular grand strategy video games, most notably Europa Universalis, the AGEod collection including Birth of America, AGEOD's American Civil War, Pax Romana, Great Invasions, and World War I: lla Grande Guerre '14-'18.

He was the original designer of Europa Universalis as a board game that was published in 1993 by Azure Wish, before leading the adaptation of the hit game for PC in 2000 in collaboration with Target Games that became Paradox Development Studio, and then co-founding AGEod in 2005, that he subsequently merged with Paradox Interactive in December 2009. Working as independent game designer since 2012.

Board games 

Philippe Thibaut is the game designer of the boardgame Europa Universalis in 1993 (with later expansions). 
He also designed the boardgame la Grande Guerre '14-'18in 1995.
Both of the above were published by AWE.

Other designs are still unpublished to date.

Video games 

The games developed, co-developed and/or produced by Philippe Thibaut:

References

External links
 Philippe's profile at Mobygames

French video game designers
Living people
Video game producers
Video game programmers
Year of birth missing (living people)